Madonna of the Streets is a 1924 American drama film directed by Edwin Carewe and written by Frank Griffin, Frederic Hatton, and Fanny Hatton. It is based on the 1904 novel The Ragged Messenger by W. B. Maxwell. The film stars Alla Nazimova, Milton Sills, Claude Gillingwater, Courtenay Foote, Wallace Beery, and Anders Randolf. The film was released on October 19, 1924, by First National Pictures.

Plot
Rev. John Morton, who is determined to follow as closely as possible the teachings of Jesus, inherits a considerable fortune when his uncle dies. Shortly thereafter he succumbs to the wiles of Mary Carlson and marries her. To Mary's dismay, John uses his money for charitable work. When John learns that not only has Mary been unfaithful to him but she was also his uncle's mistress and became Mrs. Morton in order to share the inheritance she believed to be rightfully hers, he sends her away with his secretary. Years later, John regrets his harshness; and he is reunited with Mary when she appears at a home for fallen women, which he is dedicating.

Cast

Preservation
With no prints of Madonna of the Streets located in any film archives, it is a lost film.

See also
Madonna of the Streets (1930)

References

External links

1924 films
1920s English-language films
Silent American drama films
1924 drama films
First National Pictures films
Films directed by Edwin Carewe
American silent feature films
American black-and-white films
1920s American films